Raul Salvatierra (born July 15, 1991) is a Bolivian professional basketball player.  He currently plays for Gimnasia y Esgrima of the Torneo Nacional de Ascenso in Argentina.

He was a member of Bolivia's national basketball team at the 2016 South American Basketball Championship in Caracas, Venezuela. There, he was Bolivia's best rebounder.

External links
 Latinbasket.com profile

References

1991 births
Living people
Bolivian men's basketball players
Centers (basketball)
People from Beni Department